Stephen Burks may refer to:

 Stephen Burks (economist)
 Stephen Burks (designer)